Skyline College is a public community college in San Bruno, California. It is one of three comprehensive community colleges in the San Mateo County Community College District. It was opened in 1969.

Skyline College claims an annual population of over 17,000 students. Students can choose from more than 100 degree and certificate programs.

Academics 

With a full schedule of courses leading to over 100 associate degrees, certificates, and a bachelor's degree, Skyline College's academic programs aim to prepare students for transfer to a four-year university or to directly enter the workforce. The college has transfer agreements with a wide range of public and private colleges and offers 18 associate degrees for transfer that offer a streamlined pathway to transfer, securing guaranteed admission with junior standing to the California State University system.

Student government
The students of Skyline College have established a student body association named Associated Students of Skyline College (ASSC). The association is required by law to "encourage students to participate in the governance of the college".

The ASSC periodically participates in meetings sponsored by a statewide community college student organization named Student Senate for California Community Colleges. The statewide Student Senate is authorized by law "to advocate before the Legislature and other state and local governmental entities".

See also

 California Community Colleges system
 Cañada College, a community college located in Redwood City
 College of San Mateo, a community college located in San Mateo
 San Mateo County Community College District

Notes

External links

Official website

Two-year colleges in the United States
Universities and colleges in San Mateo County, California
California Community Colleges
Schools accredited by the Western Association of Schools and Colleges
San Bruno, California
Educational institutions established in 1969
1969 establishments in California